Waakye is a Ghanaian dish of cooked rice and beans, commonly eaten for breakfast or lunch.  However, others eat it for supper. The rice and beans, usually black eyed peas or cow beans, are cooked together, along with red dried sorghum leaf sheaths or stalks and limestone. The sorghum leaves and limestone give the dish its characteristic flavor and a red appearance and the sorghum is taken out before consumption. The word waakye is from the Nigerian Hausa language and means beans. It is the contracted form of the full name shinkafa da wake which means rice and beans.

Waakye is commonly sold by roadside vendors. It is then commonly wrapped in banana leaf and accompanied by one or more of Wele stew, boiled chicken eggs, garri, shito, vegetable salad of cabbage, onions and tomatoes, spaghetti (which is called talia in Ghana) or fried plantain.

History 
The dish, which originated from the Hausa people, may be the origin of the rice and beans dishes commonly found in the Caribbean and South America, brought there through slave trade.

Preparation 
Waakye is usually prepared by first boiling the beans together with dried millet stalk leaves for the beans to get softer and reddish before adding rice to it on fire.

See also

Rice and beans
Cuisine of Ghana
List of African dishes

References 

Ghanaian cuisine
African cuisine
Rice dishes
Legume dishes
Vegetarian cuisine